The 2012 Missouri Valley Conference baseball tournament took place from May 22 through 26.  All eight teams met in the double-elimination tournament held at Missouri State's Hammons Field in Springfield, MO.   won their third tournament championship and second in a row and earned the conference's automatic bid to the 2012 NCAA Division I baseball tournament.

Seeding and format
The league's eight teams were seeded based on conference winning percentage.  They then played a two bracket, double-elimination format tournament, with the winner of each bracket then playing a single elimination final.

Results

All-Tournament Team
The following players were named to the All-Tournament Team.

Most Outstanding Player
Mike Gerber was named Most Outstanding Player.  Gerber was an outfielder for Creighton.

References

Tournament
Missouri Valley Conference Baseball Tournament
Missouri Valley Conference baseball tournament
Missouri Valley Conference baseball tournament